Streamlight is a company located in Eagleville, Pennsylvania, United States, that manufactures flashlights powered by various rechargeable and disposable batteries.

Their product line features hand-held and weapon-mountable lights as well as a right angle light used by firefighters on their turnout gear. Several of their products utilize dual sources, combining the long life of LED lamps with more powerful but shorter-lived conventional incandescent lamps. They also produce a series of Laser Illuminators such as the one of their newest models the TLR-8 which is a combination LED weapon light and laser.

Streamlight developed a handheld 1 million candlepower (981,000 candela) searchlight as a commercial spin-off of technology developed by Johnson Space Center for NASA as part of the Apollo program.

After the handheld design was perfected, the company was moved to King of Prussia, Pennsylvania by a private investor. In 1977, the headquarters was moved to Norristown, Pennsylvania. In 2001, the company moved to Eagleville, Pennsylvania.

See also 
Flashlight

References 

Flashlights
Lighting brands